Knockalton Lower (Cnoc Alltáin Íochtarach in Irish) is a townland in the historical Barony of Ormond Upper, County Tipperary, Ireland.

Location
Knockalton Lower is located in north County Tipperary west of Nenagh between the R445 road and the M7 motorway

Structures of note
Knockalton/Lisbunny standing Stone, bordering the townlands of Knockalton Lower and Lisbunny, County Tipperary is of limestone. It is 2.15m in height and 60 to 80cm in width. 

Knockalton House is a detached house, built around 1800. The refurbished house along with its outbuildings is listed as being of architectural interest.

References

Townlands of County Tipperary